Macrocheles carinatus is a species of mite in the family Macrochelidae. It is found in Europe.

References

External links

 

carinatus
Articles created by Qbugbot
Animals described in 1839